Uspenka is a rural locality (a selo) in Dichnyansky Selsoviet Rural Settlement, Kurchatovsky District, Kursk Oblast, Russia. Population:

Geography 
The selo is located in the Dichnya River basin (a tributary of the Seym River), 35 km south-west of Kursk, 3.5 km east of the district center – the town Kurchatov, 1.5 km from the selsoviet center – Dichnya. Uspenka is 159 m above sea level.

 Climate
Uspenka has a warm-summer humid continental climate (Dfb in the Köppen climate classification).

Transport 
Uspenka is located 25 km from the federal route  Crimea Highway, on the road of regional importance  (Kursk – Lgov – Rylsk – border with Ukraine), 7.5 km from the road  (M2 – Ivanino), 1.5 km from the road of intermunicipal significance  (38K-017 – Lukashevka), 1.5 km from the nearest railway halt 428 km (railway line Lgov I — Kursk).

The rural locality is situated 41 km from Kursk Vostochny Airport, 127 km from Belgorod International Airport and 244 km from Voronezh Peter the Great Airport.

References

Notes

Sources

Rural localities in Kurchatovsky District, Kursk Oblast